Brachycephalus olivaceus is a species of frog in the family Brachycephalidae. It is very tiny and was one of seven new species described by LF Ribeiro and a team of scientists from the Mater Natura - Instituto de Estudos Ambientais in Brazil. Like all species in its genus, it is found in a very small strip of Atlantic Forest in the southeastern coast of the country, and has a vibrant colour pattern. The speciation seen in this genus is thought to be a byproduct of the rift between the valley versus mountain terrain and its particular microclimates, to which they are adapted. It might be in population decline due to habitat loss. Its name derives from the Latin olivaceus, "olive-colored", in reference to its coloration.

Description
The skin on its dorsum shows no dermal co-ossification. Its rugose body is similar to that of B. mariaeterezae (as opposed to the smooth dorsum of other species such as B. izecksohni or B. pernix. Its predominantly dark-green dorsum is distinct from all other Brachycephalus species.

Distribution
Brachycephalus olivaceus is known only from two localities, which are the base of the Serra Queimada and Castelo dos Bugres, a notable rock formation in the northeastern State of Santa Catarina.

References

Further reading

External links
Photos from the 7 new species

Brachycephalus
Endemic fauna of Brazil
Amphibians of Brazil
Frogs of South America
Amphibians described in 2015